Eugene Lavretsky was named Fellow of the Institute of Electrical and Electronics Engineers in 2016 for contributions to the development of adaptive and robust flight control technologies.  He works for The Boeing Company.

References 

Fellow Members of the IEEE
Living people
Engineers from California
Claremont Graduate University alumni
Year of birth missing (living people)
American electrical engineers